Thallah Chaudrian is a village that is located in Baragowah, Jhelum District, Punjab, Pakistan, and near Padhri. It has 120 houses and its condition is better than other areas. Most of village people are working in other countries especially UAE and Europe. The people of the village are comparatively educated and literacy rate of the village is better than the other villages of the area.

Populated places in Jhelum District